The North American NA-35 was a training aircraft designed by North American Aviation. It was first test-flown in January 1940 by Vance Breese. Although announced for trade the month after, the project was pushed aside by plant expansions and the development of the P-51 Mustang. Further test flights were conducted and construction began on a few more aircraft, but the project remained stagnant until Vega Aircraft Corporation bought the rights to the aircraft in October 1940 to develop into the Vega 35.

Specifications

See also

References

External links

NA-35
1940s United States military trainer aircraft